PHD finger protein 2 is a protein that in humans is encoded by the PHF2 gene.

Function
This gene encodes a protein which contains a zinc finger-like PHD (plant homeodomain) finger, distinct from other classes of zinc finger motifs, and a hydrophobic and highly conserved domain. The PHD finger shows the typical Cys4-His-Cys3 arrangement. PHD finger genes are thought to belong to a diverse group of transcriptional regulators possibly affecting eukaryotic gene expression by influencing chromatin structure.

References

Further reading 

Human proteins